356th may refer to:

356th Airlift Squadron (356 AS), part of the 433d Airlift Wing at Kelly Field Annex, Texas
356th Fighter Group, inactive United States Air Force organization
356th Tactical Fighter Squadron, inactive United States Air Force fighter squadron

See also
356 (number)
356, the year 356 (CCCLVI) of the Julian calendar
356 BC